Ulisse Caputo (1872–1948) was a Neapolitan painter who resided in Paris.

He was born in Salerno He studied under Domenico Morelli and was a collaborator of Gaetano Esposito. Caputo first exhibited in the 1900 Venice Biennale. He painted genre subjects, often finely dressed and in intimate familial situations. He also painted East Asian subjects.

References

19th-century Italian painters
Italian male painters
Painters from Naples
People from Salerno
1872 births
1948 deaths
20th-century Italian painters
19th-century Italian male artists
20th-century Italian male artists